Esmailabad Rural District is in Bostan District of Baharestan County, Tehran province, Iran. At the National Census of 2006, its population (as a part of Robat Karim County) was 35 in 10 households. The population at the following census of 2011 was below the reporting threshold, by which time the district, together with Golestan District, had been separated from the county and Baharestan County established. At the most recent census of 2016, the population of the rural district was zero. Its only village was the Ahmadabad Culture and Technology Complex, with a population of zero.

References 

Baharestan County

Rural Districts of Tehran Province

Populated places in Tehran Province

Populated places in Baharestan County